Edward Bonfoy Giller (July 8, 1918 – October 1, 2017) was a United States Air Force (USAF) major general who served as the assistant general manager for military application, United States Atomic Energy Commission, Germantown, Maryland. Giller was assistant director and then director of the Research Directorate for the Air Force Special Weapons Center at Kirtland Air Force Base in the 1950s and 60s. He was the USAF Liaison officer for the Project Orion.

Personal life
Giller was born in Jacksonville, Illinois, on 8 July 1918. He grew up in White Hall, Illinois. He attended Kemper Military School, MO for his last two years of high school. In 1940, he obtained a Bachelor of Science degree in Chemical Engineering from University of Illinois, where he was a member of Gamma Zeta chapter of Alpha Tau Omega fraternity. He worked for Sinclair Oil Refining Company in Houston, TX until the advent of WWII.

World War II
Giller served as a P-38J Lightning and P-51D Mustang fighter pilot with the 343d Fighter Squadron, 55th Fighter Group, for the United States Army Air Force during World War II. His P-38 and all four of his Mustangs were named "The Millie G", for his wife, airline stewardess Mildred, and coded 'CY-G'. He served as commanding officer of the 343d, and later, as deputy commander of the 55th. He had three confirmed kills, including a Messerschmitt Me 262 over Munich on 9 April 1945. Giller also had six credited ground kills and two damaged. He was wounded when his cockpit was hit by flak over Munich on 16 April 1945 – he flew two hours to the UK with one arm.

Giller's military decorations and awards include the Silver Star, Legion of Merit with oak leaf cluster, Distinguished Flying Cross with oak leaf cluster, Air Medal with 17 oak leaf clusters, Purple Heart, Distinguished Unit Citation Emblem, and the French Croix de Guerre.

Career
Between 1954 and 1959 he was the Special Assistant Director and later the Director of the Research Directorate, Air Force Special Weapons Center, Kirtland Air Force Base, New Mexico.

Project Orion
Giller was the USAF Liaison officer for the Project Orion nuclear powered spacecraft.

Death
Giller died in October 2017 at the age of 99. He was married to his wife, the former Mildred Schmidt, of Grants Pass, Oregon, for 69 years until her death 16 November 2012. They had five children.

Media appearances
 To Mars by A-Bomb: The Secret History of Project Orion (BBC, 2003)

References

1918 births
2017 deaths
Military personnel from Illinois
People from Jacksonville, Illinois
People from White Hall, Illinois
Recipients of the Air Force Distinguished Service Medal
Recipients of the Distinguished Flying Cross (United States)
Recipients of the Legion of Merit
Recipients of the Silver Star
United States Air Force generals
United States Army Air Forces pilots of World War II
University of Illinois alumni